Targ Węglowy (German: Kohlenmarkt; Kashubian: Wãglowi Tôrg) is a square in the Main City, Gdańsk, Poland and a part of Royal Road.

History 
Current location of the square was addmited to the city in 1342. Since the 15th century, the square was used as a place of coal trade.

On 13 January 2019, the mayor of the city of Gdańsk, Paweł Adamowicz was assassinated at the square. In the 1 year anniversary of the event, the plate in memory of the mayor was placed at the square.

Buildings 
 Academy of Fine Arts
 Great Armory
 Katownia
 LOT Building
 Millenium Tree
 Saint George Brotherhood Manor
 Słomian Tower
 Wybrzeże Theatre

References

External link 

Squares in Poland
Gdańsk